Magandang Gabi... Bayan named after the signature open and closing lines of Noli de Castro, was a Philippine news magazine program which aired on ABS-CBN. It premiered on August 21, 1988, and ended on December 31, 2005.

History
The program was first broadcast on August 21, 1988, with its first anchor Kabayan Noli de Castro. The program's aim was to expose illegalities of some Philippine government officials as well as to render public service to the Filipinos. 

The program was styled in the lines of U.S. news magazine programs 60 Minutes and Dateline. At Undás (All Saints' Day) every year, special episodes featuring horror stories were broadcast. Theses included reenactments of alleged paranormal incidents around the country. On the other hand, At the first week of the year, it features the reports about the New Year activities were broadcast. These included the victims of the illegal firecrackers around the country and the New Year Celebrations throughout the world.

After de Castro's election as Senator of the Philippines in 2001 and subsequent election as Vice President of the Philippines in 2004, the show had substitute hosts, including Kat de Castro (De Castro's daughter), Erwin Tulfo and Henry Omaga-Diaz.

The final episode was broadcast on December 31, 2005.

Hosts
Main hosts
Noli de Castro (1988–2004)
Kat de Castro (2001–2005)
Erwin Tulfo (2001–2005)
Henry Omaga-Diaz (2001–2005)

Guest hosts
Kris Aquino
Ted Failon
Ces Oreña-Drilon
Mon Ilagan
Kata Inocencio
Cherie Mercado
Cheryl Cosim
Julius Babao
Gus Abelgas
Tony Velasquez
Cathy Yap-Yang
Francis Pangilinan
Atty. Dong Puno
Korina Sanchez
Aljo Bendijo
Christine Bersola
Mike Cohen
Pinky Webb
Pia Hontiveros
Alex Santos
Gel Santos-Relos
Marc Logan

See also
List of Philippine television shows
List of shows previously aired by ABS-CBN
Brigada Siete
KBYN: Kaagapay ng Bayan

References

External links
Telebisyon.net

Philippine television shows
1988 Philippine television series debuts
2005 Philippine television series endings
ABS-CBN original programming
Filipino-language television shows
Television series by Bayan Productions
ABS-CBN News and Current Affairs shows